Joshua Ryan Bolt (born 2 May 1994) is an English–Finnish actor. He starred in the 2009 film The Be All and End All, a role which saw him shortlisted for the best newcomer at the 2009 British Independent Film Awards.

Early life
Joshua Ryan Bolt was born in Liverpool on 2 May 1994, and grew up in the Liverpool suburb of Hunt's Cross.

Career
Bolt began acting at the age of 12 when he was cast in a theatre production of Much Ado About Nothing. In 2009, he played Pete Shotton in the BAFTA nominated film Nowhere Boy. He went on to appear in the ninth series of Shameless, playing the pot smoking psychopath Frasier Kane. He is featured in the music video for punk band The Luka State's single, "Kick in The Teeth".

In summer 2011, it was announced that Bolt had won the lead role of Henry in ITV1's Just Henry, which aired over the Christmas period of that same year. Upon completing Just Henry, he joined the second series of Accused. In January 2012, he began work on the six-part BBC series Last Tango in Halifax (2012), playing Raphael "Raff" Greenwood. He guest starred in the last two episodes of seventh season of the detective series Lewis. In July 2012, IMDB named him as one of their rising British teenage stars.

Bolt played Brian Harris, a central character, in the two-part BBC Three drama The Crash which centres on a car crash inspired by real life events. He portrayed Daniel in the third series of Scott & Bailey. In February 2013, he began work on The Heart of Nowhere, a film directed by Charlie Fink to coincide with Noah and the Whale's final album; he played Floyd, the bassist of the group. At the 2013 BAFTA television awards, Last Tango in Halifax won best drama and filming began in June 2013 of its second series. Bolt reprised his role as Raff. He returned for the third series in 2014 and the fourth in 2016.

In March 2015, producers of the hit sitcom Benidorm announced that Bolt had been cast as part of a brand new family for Series 8, which aired in January 2016. Bolt played Rob Dawson, the family's son, who befriends regular characters Tyger Dyke and Joey Ellis. Bolt lent his voice to the Doctor Who audio series from Big Finish. The episode, entitled "Dethras", featured Bolt alongside the fourth incarnation of the title character and was released in 2017. He appeared alongside in the second series of Grantchester playing an undercover agent and Marxist. He played a young soldier named Thomas Macquillan in the ITV drama Harry Price Ghost Hunter, ITV's adaptation of Neil Spring's debut novel, The Ghost Hunters. The film aired on ITV on 27 December 2015.

Bolt starred as Reburrus, a young boy hungry for revenge following the slaughter of his family, in Barbarians Rising, an eight-part drama for the History Channel airing in the U.S. and the UK. It charted the rise and fall of the Roman Empire. In December, he recorded another Doctor Who title from Big Finish, entitled "Agents of Chaos", this time playing Kalan, a companion of the War Doctor. In the autumn of 2016, he filmed a two part Christmas special of Last Tango in Halifax. Later that year, Bolt recorded the second volume of The Story of a New Name, which was written by Elena Ferrante and adapted by Timberlake Wertenbaker for BBC Radio 4; he played the part of Antonio.

He appeared in five episodes of series 10 of Benidorm, reprising his role of Rob Dawson. He played Donal in the 2019 film A Good Woman is Hard to Find.

In late 2017 Bolt played Spod a companion of Alex Kingston in the fourth series of the River Song diaries from Big Finish.

In 2018 Josh was cast by George Clooney and David Michod for the role of Dunbar in their adaptation of Catch-22.

Filmography

Film

Television

References

External links 
 
 

1994 births
Living people
People from Hunt's Cross
Male actors from Liverpool
English male television actors
English male film actors
Finnish male television actors
Finnish male film actors
21st-century English male actors
English expatriates in the United States